The 2010 British Academy Television Awards were held on 6 June 2010. The nominations were announced on 10 May.
This year new awards were added including the award for Best Actor/Actress in a Supporting Role. Graham Norton hosted the ceremony. Winners are in bold.

Nominations
Best Actor
Kenneth Branagh – Wallander (BBC One)
Brendan Gleeson – Into the Storm (BBC Two)
John Hurt – An Englishman in New York (ITV)
David Oyelowo – Small Island (BBC One)
Best Actress
Helena Bonham Carter – Enid (BBC Four)
Sophie Okonedo – Mrs Mandela (BBC Four)
Julie Walters – A Short Stay in Switzerland (BBC One)
Julie Walters – Mo (Channel 4)
Best Supporting Actor
Benedict Cumberbatch – Small Island (BBC One)
Tom Hollander – Gracie! (BBC Four)
Gary Lewis – Mo (Channel 4)
Matthew Macfadyen – Criminal Justice (BBC One)
Best Supporting Actress
Rebecca Hall – Red Riding 1974 (Channel 4)
Sophie Okonedo – Criminal Justice (BBC One)
Lauren Socha – The Unloved (Channel 4)
Imelda Staunton – Cranford (BBC One)
Best Entertainment Performance
Stephen Fry – QI (BBC One)
Harry Hill – Harry Hill's TV Burp (ITV)
Anthony McPartlin & Declan Donnelly – I'm a Celebrity...Get Me Out of Here! (ITV)
Michael McIntyre – Michael McIntyre's Comedy Roadshow (BBC One)
Best Female Performance in a Comedy Role
Jo Brand – Getting On (BBC Four)
Rebecca Front – The Thick of It (BBC Two)
Miranda Hart – Miranda (BBC Two)
Joanna Scanlan – Getting On (BBC Four)
Best Male Performance in a Comedy Role
Simon Bird – The Inbetweeners (E4)
Peter Capaldi – The Thick of It (BBC Two)
Hugh Dennis – Outnumbered Christmas Special (BBC One)
David Mitchell – Peep Show (Channel 4)
Best Single Drama
A Short Stay in Switzerland (BBC One)
Five Minutes of Heaven (BBC Two)
Mo (Channel 4)
The Unloved (Channel 4)
Best Drama Series 
Being Human (BBC Three)
Misfits (E4)
Spooks (BBC One)
The Street (BBC One)
Best Drama Serial
Occupation (BBC One)
Red Riding (Channel 4)
Small Island (BBC One)
Unforgiven (ITV)
Best Continuing Drama
The Bill (ITV)
Casualty (BBC One)
Coronation Street (ITV)
EastEnders (BBC One)
Best International Programme
Family Guy (BBC Three)
Mad Men (BBC Four)
Nurse Jackie (BBC Two)
True Blood (FX)
Best Factual Series
Blood, Sweat and Takeaways (BBC Three)
The Family (Channel 4)
One Born Every Minute (Channel 4)
Who Do You Think You Are? (BBC One)
Best Specialist Factual
Art of Russia (BBC Four)
Chemistry: A Volatile History (BBC Four)
Inside Nature's Giants (Channel 4)
Yellowstone (BBC Two)
Best Single Documentary
Katie: My Beautiful Face (Channel 4)
Louis Theroux: A Place for Paedophiles (BBC Two)
Tsunami: Caught on Camera (Channel 4)
Wounded (BBC One)
Best Feature
The Choir: Unsung Town (BBC Two)
Heston's Feasts (Channel 4)
James May's Toy Stories (BBC Two)
Masterchef: The Professionals (BBC Two)
Best Current Affairs
Dispatches – Afghanistan: Behind Enemy Lines (Channel 4)
Generation Jihad (BBC Two)
This World – Gypsy Child Thieves (BBC Two)
Dispatches – Terror in Mumbai (Channel 4)
Best News Coverage
The Haiti Earthquake (BBC News Channel)
Haiti Earthquake (Channel 4 News)
Haiti (ITV News at Ten)
Pakistan: Terror's Frontline (Sky News)
Best Sport
F1 – The Brazilian Grand Prix (BBC One/BBC Sport)
2009 FA Cup Final (ITV/ITV Sport)
World Athletics Championships (BBC Two/BBC Sport)
UEFA Champions League Live (ITV/ITV Sport)
New Media
Antony Gormley's One & Other
Life Begins (One Born Every Minute)
Primeval Evolved
The Virtual Revolution
Best Entertainment Programme
Britain's Got Talent (ITV)
The Graham Norton Show (BBC One)
Harry Hill's TV Burp (ITV)
Newswipe with Charlie Brooker (BBC Four)
Best Comedy Programme
The Armstrong and Miller Show (BBC One)
The Kevin Bishop Show (Channel 4)
Stewart Lee's Comedy Vehicle (BBC Two)
That Mitchell and Webb Look (BBC Two)
Best Situation Comedy
The Inbetweeners (E4)
Miranda (BBC Two)
Peep Show (Channel Four)
The Thick of It (BBC Two)
YouTube Audience Award
Britain's Got Talent (ITV)
Glee (E4)
The Inbetweeners (E4)
The One Show (BBC One)
The X Factor (ITV)
Unforgiven (ITV)
Special Award
Simon Cowell
BAFTA Fellowship
Melvyn Bragg

References

External links
BAFTA Television Awards Official site

2010 awards in the United Kingdom
Television 2010
2010 television awards
2010 in British television
June 2010 events in the United Kingdom